George Neely "Slats" McConnell (September 16, 1877 – May 10, 1964) was a pitcher in Major League Baseball. He played for the New York Highlanders/Yankees, Chicago Cubs, and Chicago Whales. His key pitch was the spitball.

He was born and raised in Bedford, Tennessee, the son of Neely S McConnell and Martha Jane Morton, married Elizabeth Pokorney  (born 1895 in Illinois) and lived in Chattanooga, Tennessee. They had three children, 1 boy and 2 girls, although Elizabeth's age would imply that the first child (born about 1909) may have been from an earlier marriage. George McConnell is buried in Forest Hills Cemetery, Chattanooga.

References

External links

1877 births
1964 deaths
Major League Baseball pitchers
New York Highlanders players
New York Yankees players
Chicago Cubs players
Chicago Whales players
Baseball players from Tennessee
People from Shelbyville, Tennessee
Dayton Veterans players
Wheeling Stogies players
Buffalo Bisons (minor league) players
Rochester Bronchos players
Jersey City Skeeters players
Kansas City Blues (baseball) players